The Fast Breeder Test Reactor (FBTR) is a breeder reactor located at Kalpakkam, Tamil Nadu, India. The Indira Gandhi Center for Atomic Research (IGCAR) and Bhabha Atomic Research Centre (BARC) jointly designed, constructed, and operate the reactor.

History
The reactor was designed to produce 40 MW of thermal power and 13.2 MW of electrical power.

The FBTR has rarely operated at its designed capacity and had to be shut down between 1987 and 1989 due to technical problems. From 1989 to 1992, the reactor operated at 1 MW. 

In 1993, the reactor's power level was raised to 10.5 MW. In September 2002, fuel burn-up in the FBTR for the first time reached the 100,000 megawatt-days per metric ton uranium (MWd/MTU) mark. This is considered an important milestone in breeder reactor technology. On March 7, 2022 it attained the design power level of 40 MWt.

Using the experience gained from the operation of the FBTR, a 500 MWe Prototype Fast Breeder Reactor (PFBR) is in advanced stage of construction at Kalpakkam.

Technical details
The reactor uses a plutonium-uranium mixed carbide fuel and liquid sodium as a coolant. The fuel is an indigenous mix of 70 percent plutonium carbide and 30 percent uranium carbide. Plutonium for the fuel is extracted from irradiated fuel in the Madras power reactors and reprocessed in Tarapur.

Some of the uranium is created from the transmutation of thorium bundles that are also placed in the core.

References

Liquid metal fast reactors
Nuclear technology in India
1985 establishments in Tamil Nadu